František Hanus (12 May 1916 – 2 September 1991) was a Czech actor and occasional voice actor. He appeared in more than 50 films and television shows between 1941 and 1990.

Selected filmography
 Spring Song (1944)
 Saturday (film) (1945)
 Řeka čaruje (1945)
 Motorcycles (1949)
 Focus, Please! (1956)

References

External links
 

1916 births
1991 deaths
Czech male film actors
People from Valašské Meziříčí
20th-century Czech male actors
Czech male stage actors
Czech male television actors